Arcis-le-Ponsart is a commune in the Marne department in northeastern France. It is located along the D25 road, south of Courville,  by road southwest of Reims. The local economy is mainly agricultural based. Igny Abbey lies in this commune.

Toponymy
Until the early nineteenth century, the town was called Arcis-le-Poussart or simply Pousard. The name Arcis comes from the Latin word "arx", meaning "fortified place"; and the nickname Ponsart refers to a former local knight from Arcy, Ponsard.

History
In 1127, Bernard of Clairvaux founded Igny Abbey on land purchased from Ponsard. During the twelfth and thirteenth centuries, the monks of this abbey cleared and cultivated the land and surrounding forests. Arcis-le-Ponsard was damaged repeatedly, including the troops of the Hundred Years War, those of Charles V, the Franco-Spanish War (1635–1659), the French Revolutionary Wars, and the Prussian and Russian armies of 1814. During the First World War, a military camp was installed here.

Landmarks
The Église Notre-Dame, a ruin, is attributed partly to twelfth century and partly Renaissance style. It became a historical monument on November 18, 1919. The Abbaye Notre-Dame d'Igny was founded in the 1120s by monks from the Abbey of Clairvaux, sent by St. Bernard of Clairvaux. Following a pilgrimage to the abbey which brought rapid development, a daughter house, Signy Abbey, was founded in 1135. The second abbot, Guerric of Igny, was raised to the rank of Blessed; his relics are still venerated in Igny. At the time of the French Revolution, the religious community was dispersed. It was rebuilt in 1780. Monastic life resumed in 1876 with the support of the Diocese of Reims. Destroyed in 1918, the abbey was rebuilt in 1929 and occupied by a community of nuns from Laval.

Population

See also
Communes of the Marne department

References

Communes of Marne (department)